Brandon Gray Internet Services, Inc., doing business as "NameJuice.com," was an ICANN accredited domain name registry operator based in Markham, Ontario. The company is in the business of registering, renewing and transferring Internet domains and subdomains. The company and its re-sellers have become notorious for domain name scams. 

The company was suspended by ICANN in July 2014, barred from registering names until Oct. 17, 2014. Using resellers, the company sent misleading materials that are "false or deceptive to Registered Name Holders," for more than a decade. It operates under multiple re-seller names, such as Domain Registry of America, Domain Registry of Australia, Domain Registry of Canada, Domain Registry of Europe, Domain Renewal Group, Internet Corporation Listing Service, Internet Registry of Canada, Liberty Names of America, Registration Services Inc., Yellow Business.ca.

References

External links

 Brandon Gray Internet Services Inc. Litigation Retrieved August 2, 2014.
 ICANN   Notice of breach of registrar accreditation agreement. Retrieved August 2, 2014.
 ICANN Notice of suspension of registrar’s ability to create new registered names or initiate inbound transfers of registered names. Retrieved August 2, 2014.
 Ontario registrar stopped from selling dot ca domains. Retrieved August 2, 2014.
 Domain registry of America get slapped in UK Retrieved August 2, 2014.
 ASA Adjudication on Domain Registry of America. Retrieved August 2, 2014.

Companies based in Ontario
Criticisms of companies